WEVA is a Full Service-formatted broadcast radio station licensed to Emporia, Virginia, serving Emporia and Greensville County, Virginia.  WEVA is owned and operated by Colonial Media Corporation.

References

External links
 WEVA AM 86 Online

1952 establishments in Virginia
Full service radio stations in the United States
Radio stations established in 1952
EVA
Emporia, Virginia
EVA